MMG Limited is a mid-tier global resources company that mines, explores and develops base metal projects around the world. MMG's largest shareholder is China Minmetals with 68%.

History
MMG was formed in June 2009, following the purchase of the majority of assets of Oz Minerals by China Minmetals.

In December 2010, MMG was acquired by Minmetals Resources, a subsidiary of China Minmetals and listed on the Hong Kong Stock Exchange.

In September 2012, Minmetals Resources Limited changed its registered company name to MMG Limited to align the assets already operating as MMG with the registered company name.

In December 2015, MMG became a dual-listed company when a secondary listing was made on the Australian Securities Exchange. It was delisted from the Australian Securities Exchange in December 2019.

Operations
MMG operate and develop copper, zinc and other base metals projects across Australia, the Democratic Republic of the Congo and Peru.

Current
Dugald River mine in Cloncurry, Queensland
Kinsevere mine in the Democratic Republic of Congo
Las Bambas copper mine in Peru (62.5%)
Rosebery mine in Tasmania

Former
Century Mine
Golden Grove Mine
Sepon mine

References

Companies based in Melbourne
Companies formerly listed on the Australian Securities Exchange
Companies listed on the Hong Kong Stock Exchange
Dual-listed companies
Copper mining companies of Australia
Gold mining companies of Australia
Government-owned companies of China
Lead mining companies
Metal companies of China
Silver mining companies
Zinc mining companies